The 2019 Pro14 Grand Final was the final match of the 2018–19 Pro14 season. The 2018–19 season is the fifth with Guinness as the title sponsor, the tenth with a Grand Final and the second season with 14 teams, following the admission of two South African teams. The final was played between Glasgow Warriors and Leinster and was played at the 60,000 seater, Celtic Park in Glasgow, home to Scottish football giants and former European Cup winners Celtic. Leinster won the game 18–15 to retain the title.

Route to the final

The top side from each of the two conferences are given a bye to the semi-finals and have home advantage. Teams placed second and third in opposite conferences meet in the two quarter-finals to determine the other two semi-finalists with the teams ranked second having home advantage.

The play-offs are scheduled in the four weeks after the regular season has been completed.

Quarter-finals

Semi-finals

Pre-match
Leinster head coach Leo Cullen caused a media stir ahead of the final when he commented that all the Glasgow Warriors players were Rangers fans, and that Leinster would get support from Celtic fans as they (Leinster) were an Irish team. Some quarters reacted angrily to Cullen's comments, as they were seen as being provocative and sectarian, given the Catholic–Protestant history between Rangers and Celtic. Cullen appeared to make the remarks jokingly, but nonetheless he apologised for any offence given in a press conference held the day before the final.

Final

Summary

Details

References

2019
2018–19 Pro14
Pro14 Grand Final
Glasgow Warriors matches
Leinster Rugby matches
2018–19 in Irish rugby union
2018–19 in Welsh rugby union